is a passenger railway station located in  Kanazawa-ku, Yokohama, Kanagawa Prefecture, Japan, operated by the private railway company Keikyū.

Lines
Kanazawa-bunko Station is served by the Keikyū Main Line and is located 39.5 kilometers from the terminus of the line at Shinagawa  Station in Tokyo.

Station layout
The station consists of two island platforms serving four tracks. The outside tracks 1 and 4 are used for local service; inside tracks 2 and 3 are used for express services.

Platforms

Operations 
Kanazawa-Bunko is a major station for railway operations. To increase capacity during peak hours, most Limited Express and Morning/Evening Wing services operate in a 12-car formation. In order to achieve this operation, a handful of 4-car trains are placed on standby on sidings around the station and are added to select 8-car Limited Express and Morning Wing trains to form a 12-car train bound for Shinagawa, at which the added sets are then removed. The reverse happens during the evening peak hour as the 4-car sets are removed from 12-car trains while the 8-car trains continue south on through services to the Keikyū Kurihama Line and points further south.

History
Kanazawa-bunko Station opened on April 1, 1930.

Keikyū introduced station numbering to its stations on 21 October 2010; Kanazawa-Bunko Station was assigned station number KK49.

Passenger statistics
In fiscal 2019, the station was used by an average of 69,940 passengers daily. 

The passenger figures for previous years are as shown below.

Surrounding area
 Kanazawa Bunko, a museum and library established in 1275

Bus services
Bus services from the north exit are operated by Yokohama City Bus, Daishinto Bus, and Yokohama Keikyu Bus.

See also
 List of railway stations in Japan

References

External links

  

Railway stations in Kanagawa Prefecture
Railway stations in Japan opened in 1930
Railway stations in Yokohama
Keikyū Main Line